George Streeter (born August 28, 1967) is a former American football defensive back. He played for the Chicago Bears in 1989 and for the Indianapolis Colts in 1990. Since 2022 he is the running backs coach of the Stuttgart Surge football team in the European League of Football.

References

1967 births
Players of American football from Chicago
Living people
American football defensive backs
Notre Dame Fighting Irish football players
Chicago Bears players
Indianapolis Colts players
European League of Football coaches